The quantum concentration  is the particle concentration (i.e. the number of particles per unit volume) of a system where the interparticle distance is equal to the thermal de Broglie wavelength.

Quantum effects become appreciable when the particle concentration is greater than or equal to the quantum concentration, which is defined as:

where:
 is the mass of the particles in the system
 is the Boltzmann constant
 is the temperature as measured in kelvins
 is the reduced Planck constant

The quantum concentration for room temperature protons is about 1/cubic-Angstrom.

As the quantum concentration depends on temperature, high temperatures will put most systems in the classical limit unless they have a very high density e.g. a White dwarf.

For an ideal gas the Sackur–Tetrode equation can be written in terms of the quantum concentration as

References

Statistical mechanics